Patleyna Glacier is the  long and  wide glacier on the east side of north-central Sentinel Range in Ellsworth Mountains, Antarctica, situated north of the upper course of Ellen Glacier.  It is draining the east slopes of Mount Todd and the north slopes of Chepino Saddle, and flowing north-northwestwards to join Embree Glacier southeast of Mount Goldthwait and west of Oreshak Peak.

The glacier is named after the nature reserve of Patleyna in Northeastern Bulgaria.

Location
US mapping in 1961, updated in 1988.

See also
 List of glaciers in the Antarctic
 Glaciology

Maps
 Vinson Massif.  Scale 1:250 000 topographic map.  Reston, Virginia: US Geological Survey, 1988.
 Antarctic Digital Database (ADD). Scale 1:250000 topographic map of Antarctica. Scientific Committee on Antarctic Research (SCAR). Since 1993, regularly updated.

References
 Patleyna Glacier. SCAR Composite Antarctic Gazetteer
 Bulgarian Antarctic Gazetteer. Antarctic Place-names Commission. (details in Bulgarian, basic data in English)

External links
 Patleyna Glacier. Copernix satellite image

Glaciers of Ellsworth Land
Bulgaria and the Antarctic